Minna-Maria Kangas (born 5 February 1983) is a Finnish racing cyclist, who currently rides for Bingoal-WB Ladies. In August 2020, she won the Finnish National Road Race Championships.

Major results
2016
3rd Individual Pursuit, National Track Championships

2017 
2nd Road Race, National Road Championships

2018 
1st Stage 1a Tour of Uppsala

2019 
National Road Championships
1st  Time Trial
2nd Road Race

2020 
National Road Championships
1st  Time Trial
1st  Road Race
1st  Cyclo-cross, National Cyclo-cross Championships

2021
National Road Championships
2nd Time Trial
2nd Road Race

References

External links

1983 births
Living people
Finnish female cyclists
Place of birth missing (living people)